Route nationale 11a (RN 11a) is a secondary highway in Madagascar of 204 km, running from Antsampanana to Mahanoro, to the Mangoro River. It crosses the region of Atsinanana.

Selected locations on route
(north to south)

Antsampanana junction with RN2
Vatomandry
Mahanoro – 238 km

It continues as RN 11 from  Mahanoro - Nosy Varika - 204 km -  Mananjary

See also
List of roads in Madagascar
Transport in Madagascar

References

Roads in Atsinanana
Roads in Vatovavy-Fitovinany
Roads in Madagascar